Greenhills is a suburb of Dublin in Ireland. It lies between Kimmage, Tallaght, Ballymount, Templeogue, Terenure and Walkinstown, which the area of Greenhills was historically part of, and includes a number of residential developments. A number of roads in the Greenhills area are named after saints, including Saint Peter's Road (R112 regional road), Saint James Road, Saint Joseph's Road and Saint Patrick's Road. Greenhills is in the Dublin 12 postal area of County Dublin and is in the jurisdiction of South Dublin County Council.

Name and history
The area's name comes from the sand-based hills that made up a glacial esker which formed in the area at the end of the Ice Age.

Greenhills may have housed settlements since at least the Bronze Age, as an urn dating from that time was found in the area in the late 1890s. Discovered in a former quarry between the Greenhills Road and St. Columba's Road, this urn is now held by the National Museum of Ireland.

However, the area was mostly farmland until expansion in the 1950s and 1960s, when new housing estates were built.

Facilities
Tymon Park is situated in the old townland of Greenhills and is located to the south of the Limekiln estate. It is administered by South Dublin County Council. The River Poddle and connected artificial ponds are features within the park. The M50 motorway splits the Greenhills side of the park from Kilnamanagh and the Tymon North estate (both in Tallaght). A smaller park, Greenhills Park, is also administered by the South Dublin County Council and is used for association football.

The Church of the Holy Spirit is the local Roman Catholic church. It has a verdigris copper roof. The church stands beside a community centre, which has function rooms, and advice, adult education and other services.

Local primary schools include Holy Spirit Junior and Senior Schools which were formed in September 2015 following the amalgamation of St. Paul's Junior and Senior Girl's National Schools, and St. Peter's Boy's National School. Riverview Educate Together National School opened on Limekiln Road in 2016. Secondary schools include St. Paul's Secondary (girls) and Greenhills College VEC (boys).

Transport

The Walkinstown Roundabout, or Walkinstown Cross, is a junction which serves six local roads - the Greenhills Road into Tallaght, Ballymount Road towards Ballymount and the M50, Walkinstown Avenue towards Ballyfermot, Walkinstown Road towards Drimnagh, Cromwellsfort Road towards Kimmage and Crumlin, and St. Peter's Road towards Greenhills and Templeogue.

The area is served by Dublin Bus routes 9, 15A, 27, 77A, 77X, Nitelink 77N and 150.

Sport
The former Irish international football manager, Brian Kerr, lives in Greenhills, having been brought up close-by in Drimnagh. Michael Carruth, a gold-medal winner in the welterweight boxing division at the 1992 Summer Olympics, is from the area.

Association football is one of the main sports in the area, through clubs such as Greenhills FC and Manortown United, while Gaelic football is also played, with clubs such as Crumlin GAA, Robert Emmets GAC, St Jude's GAA (Templeogue), Faughs (Templeogue) and St. James Gaels. Community Games athletics and rounders are also played - the latter represented by Limekiln Rounders Club which has won a number of national titles.

Olympian Gymnastics is based in Greenhills at a facility beside the NCT centre.

Administration
Greenhills is in the northwest of the South Dublin County Council area, and in local government elections is part of the Templeogue-Terenure local electoral area.

Greenhills is part of the Dublin South-West Dáil constituency. Since the 2016 Irish general election, the Teachtaí Dála for the area are Paul Murphy (Anti-Austerity Alliance), Sean Crowe (Sinn Féin), Colm Brophy (Fine Gael), John Lahart (Fianna Fáil) and Katherine Zappone (independent).

References

Towns and villages in South Dublin (county)